John Joseph Mackenzie (24 March 1865 – 1 August 1922) was a Canadian pathologist and bacteriologist.  He was born at St. Thomas, Ontario, and was educated at Toronto, Leipzig, and Berlin universities, and later was appointed bacteriologist at the Ontario Board of Health.  In 1900 he became professor of pathology and bacteriology in Toronto University.  He was made fellow of the Royal Society of Canada (1909), president of the Canadian Institute (1909), and a member of the Society of American Bacteriologists and of the American Association of Pathologists and Bacteriologists.  He contributed scientific papers to the medical press and published Recent Theories in Regard to the Causes of Immunity to Infectious Disease (1907).

External links 
 Biography at the Dictionary of Canadian Biography Online
John Joseph Mackenzie archival papers held at the University of Toronto Archives and Records Management Services
 

1865 births
1922 deaths
Canadian science writers
Fellows of the Royal Society of Canada
Canadian pathologists
People from St. Thomas, Ontario
University of Toronto alumni